JaCoby Stevens (born June 19, 1998) is an American football American football linebacker who is a free agent. He played college football at LSU.

Early life and high school
Stevens grew up in Murfreesboro, Tennessee and attended The Ensworth School before transferring to Oakland High School after his freshman year. Stevens played both wide receiver and defensive back for Oakland and was also a member of the basketball team. As a junior, he recorded 84 tackles, 8.5 tackles for loss, six interceptions, two fumbles recovered and scored two defensive touchdowns on defense and caught 32 passes for 806 yards with 11 touchdowns and had three rushing touchdowns on offense. As a senior, he recorded 61 tackles with 9 interceptions on defense with 34 receptions for 689 yards and 12 touchdowns on offense and was named Tennessee's Mr. Football. Stevens was rated a five-star recruit and initially committed to play college football at LSU over offers from Tennessee, Alabama, Auburn and Georgia. He decommitted during his senior season after the team fired head coach Les Miles, but ultimately re-committed.

College career
Stevens played both safety and wide receiver as a true freshman, appearing in six games with one start at wide receiver and catching two passes for 32 yards. Stevens moved permanently to safety before his sophomore year and started the last four games of the season, recording 35 tackles, 6.5 tackles for loss, 1.5 sacks and an interception with five passes broken up. In his first full season as a starter, Stevens recorded 85 tackles, 8.5 tackles for loss and five sacks with three interceptions and nine passes defended and was named second-team All-Southeastern Conference by the league's coaches and helped LSU win the 2019 National Championship. After Ja'Marr Chase opted out for the 2020 season, Stevens was selected to wear the #7 jersey, which goes to the biggest playmaker on the team.

Professional career

Stevens was selected in the sixth round with the 224th overall pick of the 2021 NFL Draft by the Philadelphia Eagles. He signed his four-year rookie contract with Philadelphia on June 9, 2021, worth $3.6 million. He was waived on August 31, 2021 and re-signed to the practice squad the next day. On January 2, 2022, Stevens made his NFL debut in the team's week 17 game against the Washington Football Team, collecting a tackle in the 20-16 victory. He signed a reserve/future contract with the Eagles on January 18, 2022.

On August 30, 2022, Stevens was waived by the Eagles.

References

External links
LSU Tigers bio

1998 births
Living people
Philadelphia Eagles players
African-American players of American football
LSU Tigers football players
Players of American football from Tennessee
American football safeties
People from Murfreesboro, Tennessee
21st-century African-American sportspeople